Uroboros Glass was an art glass manufacturer in Portland, Oregon.

History
The company was founded by Eric Lovell in 1973. In the late sixties, Lovell had rediscovered the glass-making technique of ring mottle glass, which was invented by Tiffany Studios and lost when it closed in 1928.

In 2017, the company's assets were sold to Oceanside Glass & Tile, based out of Carlsbad, California, The Portland facility stopped making sheets of glass by February 2017. following discovery of cadmium pollution near its site. Oceanside moved production to Tijuana, Mexico, and ended the Uroboros name.

References

1973 establishments in Oregon
2016 mergers and acquisitions
2017 disestablishments in Oregon
Defunct manufacturing companies based in Oregon
Design companies disestablished in 2017
Design companies established in 1973
Glassmaking companies of the United States
Manufacturing companies based in Portland, Oregon
Manufacturing companies disestablished in 2017
Manufacturing companies established in 1973